Naangu Suvargal is a 1971 Indian Tamil-language film written and directed by K. Balachander. The film stars Jaishankar, Ravichandran and Vanisri. It was released on 6 February 1971.

Plot

Cast 
 Jaishankar
 Ravichandran
 Vanisri
 Nagesh
 Sowcar Janaki
 Vijaya Lalitha
 R. S. Manohar
 Srividya

Production 
Naangu Suvargal was directed by K. Balachander who also wrote the story and dialogue. It was produced by V. S. Sharma and P. S. Mani under Screen Entertainment, and was Balachander's first colour venture, as well the second collaboration between Jaishankar and Ravichandran as actors.

Soundtrack 
The soundtrack was composed by M. S. Viswanathan, with lyrics by Kannadasan.

Release and reception 
Naangu Suvargal was released on 6 February 1971, and was a commercial failure. T. G. Vaidyanathan of Film World described it as a "re-do" of V. Shantaram's Do Aankhen Barah Haath (1957) as it dealt with rehabilitation of criminals.

References

External links 
 

1970s Tamil-language films
1971 drama films
Films directed by K. Balachander
Films scored by M. S. Viswanathan
Indian drama films